Paulo Roberto Moccelin (born 16 March 1994), commonly known as Paulinho, is a Brazilian professional footballer who plays as a winger for Sport, on loan from Londrina.

Career
He began his career in the Juventude's Academy, which in 2012 turned professional player. However, he played little in the club, because in the beginning of 2013 was transferred for Grêmio in a package of signings who still had Alex Telles, Bressan, Ramiro and Follmann.

Because of low use in his new club, Paulinho Moccelin was loaned to Fortaleza in March 2014, in the meantime, was not well at the club and was eventually returned to Grêmio two months later. In June of the same year, Paulinho was again loaned, this time to Londrina, which has the function of helping the club of Campeonato Brasileiro Série D to higher division.

Career statistics

Honours
São José-RS
Copa FGF: 2017

Chapecoense
Campeonato Catarinense: 2020
Campeonato Brasileiro Série B: 2020

References

External links

1994 births
Living people
Sportspeople from Rio Grande do Sul
Brazilian footballers
Association football forwards
Campeonato Brasileiro Série A players
Campeonato Brasileiro Série B players
Campeonato Brasileiro Série C players
Campeonato Brasileiro Série D players
Esporte Clube Juventude players
Grêmio Foot-Ball Porto Alegrense players
Fortaleza Esporte Clube players
Londrina Esporte Clube players
Coritiba Foot Ball Club players
Cuiabá Esporte Clube players
Clube Atlético Tubarão players
Esporte Clube São José players
Maringá Futebol Clube players
Grêmio Novorizontino players
Associação Chapecoense de Futebol players
Sport Club do Recife players